The 2009 Turkmenistan Higher League (Ýokary Liga) season was the seventeenth season of Turkmenistan's professional football league. It began on 25 April 2009 with the first round of games and ended on 7 November 2009 with the 18th round of matches. FC Aşgabat is the defending champions. The first half of the season finished on 27 June 2009. The kick-off of the second half was on 4 September 2009.

Team changes from last season
Gara Altyn Balkanabat and FC Ahal withdrew from the league.

Format change
The format of the league was not changed. Since there are only 9 clubs that participate in 2009 Ýokary Liga, every team plays 2 times against every other team, what will make every team playing 16 games. Since one team will be bye each matchday, totally 18 matchdays will be played.

Overview

Standings

Positions by round

Results

League season

Top goalscorers

Last updated: 14 November 2009Source:

Statistics

Scoring
First goalscorer:
Hojaahmet Arazow for HTTU Aşgabat against Bagtyýarlyk, 33rd minute (25 April 2009)
Widest winning margin: 7 Goals
FC Aşgabat 1–8 Nebitçi Balkanabat (19 September 2009)
 Most goals in a match: 12 Goals
HTTU Aşgabat 9–3 Turan (12 June 2009)
Most goals in a draw: 4 Goals
Aşgabat 2–2 Merw (27 June 2009)
Most goals in a match by one team: 9 Goals
HTTU Aşgabat 9–3 Turan (12 June 2009)
Most goals scored by losing team: 3 goals
HTTU Aşgabat 9–3 Turan (12 June 2009)
First hat-trick of the season:
Berdi Şamyradow for HTTU Aşgabat against Nebitçi (16 May 2009)
Most goals in a match by one player: 4 goals
Berdi Şamyradow for HTTU Aşgabat against Turan Daşoguz (12 June 2009)
Mämmedaly Garadanow for Nebitçi Balkanabat against FC Aşgabat (19 September 2009)
Didargylyç Urazow for FC Altyn Asyr against Turan Daşoguz (3 October 2009)
Gurbanmuhammedow for Merw Mary against Talyp Sporty Aşgabat (24 October 2009)

International competitions

CIS Cup 2009
 CIS Cup 2009:
Aşgabat –  Russia U-21 (0–0)
Aşgabat –  MTZ-RIPO Minsk (0–4)
 FK Ekranas  – Aşgabat (3–1)

AFC President's Cup 2009
 AFC President's Cup 2009:
Aşgabat –  Sri Lanka Army (5–1)
 Abahani Ltd. – Aşgabat (0–0)
Aşgabat –  Dordoi-Dynamo (1–2)

See also
 2009 Turkmenistan Cup

External links
 http://www.turkmenistan.gov.tm 
 https://web.archive.org/web/20120703010749/http://zamantm.com/ 

Ýokary Liga seasons
Turk
Turk
1